Catherine Rayner was a British fashion designer specialising in wedding dresses.

Her designs in 1999 were admired for "classic elegance and romantic flair" and noted for their very fitted bodices and flattering cuts. One of her gowns, in bead-embroidered satin, was chosen by Sandra Boler, the editor of Brides magazine, along with shoes by Emma Hope and a bridegroom's outfit by Tom Gilbey to represent 1995's Dress of the Year in the Fashion Museum, Bath's collection. At the time, Boler described her choice as representing that year's nostalgic and period-costume-influenced trends. Rayner's designs were retailed through her boutique and through London department stores such as Dickins & Jones. Another of Rayner's designs, a pale pink strapless dress, is included in the Victoria and Albert Museum's fashion collection, and was featured on the poster for their major Wedding Dress exhibition in 2014.

References

Living people
Date of birth missing (living people)
Wedding dress designers
British fashion designers
Year of birth missing (living people)